Qushchi (also Romanized as Qūshchī; also known as Qūshcheh) is a village in Ijrud-e Pain Rural District, Halab District, Ijrud County, Zanjan Province, Iran. At the 2006 census, its population was 179, in 43 families.

References 

Populated places in Ijrud County